"Built to Last" is the second single from the band Mêlée's second full-length album, Devils & Angels, released on January 16, 2007.

The music video for the song, directed by The Malloys, features references to romantic moments in various classic films, including Say Anything..., From Here to Eternity, Ghost, Brokeback Mountain and Titanic, among others.

Charts and certifications

Weekly charts

Year-end charts

References

2007 singles
2008 singles
Warner Records singles
Music videos directed by The Malloys
2007 songs